Hamilton Township may refer to the following places in the U.S. state of Michigan:

 Hamilton Township, Clare County, Michigan
 Hamilton Township, Gratiot County, Michigan
 Hamilton Township, Van Buren County, Michigan

See also 
 Hamilton, Michigan, an unincorporated community in Allegan County

Michigan township disambiguation pages